Urophora stylata is a species of tephritid or fruit flies in the genus Urophora of the family Tephritidae.  The host plant for the larvae is usually a thistle of genus Cirsium or Carduus.

It has been introduced in North America as a biocontrol of  C. vulgare, which has become an invasive species.

Distribution
Throughout Europe East to Japan; introduced to India, Pakistan, Australia, North America.

References

Urophora
Insects described in 1775
Taxa named by Johan Christian Fabricius
Diptera of Europe
Diptera of Asia